The 1996 Philippine Basketball Association (PBA) Commissioner's Cup was the second conference of the 1996 PBA season. It started on June 14 and ended on September 10, 1996. The tournament is an Import-laden format, which requires an import or a pure-foreign player for each team with a 6'7" height limit.

Format
The following format will be observed for the duration of the conference:
The teams were divided into 2 groups.

Group A:
Alaska Milkmen
Ginebra San Miguel
Formula Shell Zoom Masters
Mobiline Cellulars

Group B:
Purefoods TJ Hotdogs
San Miguel Beermen
Sta. Lucia Realtors
Sunkist Orange Bottlers

Teams in a group will play against each other once and against teams in the other group twice; 10 games per team; Teams are then seeded by basis on win–loss records. Ties are broken among point differentials of the tied teams. Standings will be determined in one league table; teams do not qualify by basis of groupings.
 The top five teams after the eliminations will advance to the semifinals.
 Semifinals will be two round robin affairs with the remaining five teams. Results from the eliminations will be carried over. A playoff incentive for a finals berth will be given to the team that will win at least five of their eight semifinal games.
 The top two teams (or the top team and the winner of the playoff incentive) will face each other in a best-of-seven championship series. The next two teams (or the loser of the playoff incentive and the fourth seeded team) dispute the third-place trophy in a one-game playoff.

Elimination round

Team standings

Semifinal berth playoff

Semifinals

Team standings

Cumulative standings

Semifinal round standings:

Finals berth playoff

Bal David sank a three-point shot, putting the Gins on with the lead, 86–83 with 17 seconds left in the game. Richie Ticson however also made a three pointer tying the game again, 86-all with 10.5 seconds left.

After calling a timeout to design the last play, Henry James opted to try a three pointer after an inbound pass from Vince Hizon. James' shot was blocked by Benjie Paras and picked up by Kenny Redfield, making a buzzer beating three point shot, thus winning the game for them, 89–86.

Third place playoff

Finals

References

External links
 PBA.ph

Commissioner's Cup
PBA Commissioner's Cup